This article summarizes publicly known attacks against cryptographic hash functions. Note that not all entries may be up to date. For a summary of other hash function parameters, see comparison of cryptographic hash functions.

Table color key

Common hash functions

Collision resistance

Chosen prefix collision attack

Preimage resistance

Length extension

Vulnerable: MD5, SHA1, SHA256, SHA512
Not vulnerable: SHA384, SHA-3, BLAKE2

Less-common hash functions

Collision resistance

Preimage resistance

Attacks on hashed passwords

Hashes described here are designed for fast computation and have roughly similar speeds.  Because most users typically choose short passwords formed in predictable ways, passwords can often be recovered from their hashed value if a fast hash is used. Searches on the order of 100 billion tests per second are possible with high-end graphics processors.  
Special hashes called key derivation functions have been created to slow brute force searches. These include pbkdf2, bcrypt, scrypt, argon2, and balloon.

See also
 Comparison of cryptographic hash functions
 Cryptographic hash function
 Collision attack
 Preimage attack
 Length extension attack
 Cipher security summary

References

External links
 2010 summary of attacks against Tiger, MD4 and SHA-2: 

 
 
Cryptography lists and comparisons